Susan A. Phillips (born 1969) is an American anthropologist and criminologist who works as a professor of environmental analysis at Pitzer College. She is known for research on graffiti, and her books on gangs and graffiti.

Education and career
Phillips graduated in 1990 from California State University, Dominguez Hills with a bachelor's degree in civilizations. She then went to the University of California, Los Angeles (UCLA) for graduate study in anthropology, earning a master's degree in 1994 and completing a Ph.D. in 1998.

After continuing at UCLA as a lecturer for four more years, and also working as a lecturer at the ArtCenter College of Design, she became an assistant professor at Pitzer College in 2002. In 2016, as an associate professor, she was named a Getty Scholar by the Getty Research Institute.

Books
Phillips' books include:
Wallbangin': Graffiti and Gangs in L.A. (1999),
Operation Fly Trap: L. A. Gangs, Drugs, and the Law (2012), and
The City Beneath: A Century of Los Angeles Graffiti (2019)

References

External links
Home page

1969 births
Living people
American anthropologists
American women anthropologists
American criminologists
American women criminologists
Graffiti in the United States
California State University, Dominguez Hills alumni
University of California, Los Angeles alumni
University of California, Los Angeles faculty
Art Center College of Design faculty
Pitzer College faculty
American women academics
21st-century American women